Xu Xueqiang (born November 1962) is a general (shangjiang) of the People's Liberation Army (PLA), serving as head of the Equipment Development Department of the Central Military Commission since October 2022. He was the president of PLA National Defence University from 2021 to 2022 and previously served as commander of Northern Theater Command Air Force and before that, chief of staff of Nanjing Military Region Air Force.

Biography
Xu was born in November 1962. He served in  before being appointed as chief of staff of Nanjing Military Region Air Force in December 2013. In 2016, he was appointed chief of staff of the newly founded Eastern Theater Command Air Force, a position he held until August 2017, when he was transferred to Northern Theater Command Air Force and appointed commander. In August 2021, he was appointed president of PLA National Defence University, succeeding Zheng He.

He was promoted to the rank of major general (shaojiang) in 2013, lieutenant general (zhongjiang) in June 2019 and general (shangjiang) in September 2021.

References

1962 births
Living people
People from Henan
Presidents of the PLA National Defence University
People's Liberation Army Air Force generals
People's Liberation Army generals from Henan